The Rottachberg is a 1115 m high mountain in the Allgäu Alps near Rettenberg. Its summit is known as Falkenstein.

Ascend 
Two and a half hours walk from Rettenberg to Falkenstein and back. The Falkenstein is a challenging climbing area with UIAA grades VII to XI.

References

Mountains of the Alps
Allgäu Alps
Mountains of Bavaria
One-thousanders of Germany
Oberallgäu